Orstomisis is a genus of deep-sea bamboo coral in the family Isididae. It is monotypic with a single species, Orstomisis crosnieri. It is distributed across the Pacific, with populations near Polynesia, Micronesia, and as far north as Atka Island.

References

Isididae
Octocorallia genera